Lucas Búa de Miguel (born 12 January 1994) is a Spanish sprinter specialising in the 400 metres. He competed at the 2016 IAAF World Indoor Championships narrowly missing the semifinals. His personal bests in the event are 45.98 seconds outdoors (Castellón 2015) and 46.65 seconds indoors (Madrid 2016).

Competition record

References

External links

1994 births
Living people
Spanish male sprinters
Sportspeople from Toledo, Spain
World Athletics Championships athletes for Spain
Athletes (track and field) at the 2018 Mediterranean Games
European Championships (multi-sport event) bronze medalists
European Athletics Championships medalists
Mediterranean Games silver medalists for Spain
Mediterranean Games medalists in athletics
21st-century Spanish people